Hat (also, Gat and Khat) is a village in the Qubadli Rayon of Azerbaijan.
Hat is the Azeri village in Qubadli

References 

Populated places in Qubadli District